The Doe Triple-D or Doe Dual Drive is a make of tractor  produced by Ernest Doe & Sons in the 1950s and 1960s in Ulting Essex. Its two engines and 90-degree articulation made it one of the most unorthodox tractors ever built.

Development

During the 1950s farmers in the United Kingdom in need of high-power tractors had few options. Essex farmer George Pryor developed an ingenious solution to the problem by creating his own tractor. He did this by purchasing two Fordson tractors, removing the front wheels and axles and linking the two by means of a turntable which provided the steering action powered by hydraulic rams. This left him with a double-engined four-wheel—drive tractor capable of producing more power and outperforming any of the conventional tractors on the UK market at the time.

Commercial production

Local Fordson dealers Ernest Doe & Sons agreed to build an improved version, the first one was completed in 1958 and called the Doe Dual Power, later changed to Doe Dual Drive and abbreviated to Triple-D.

The vast majority of Triple-Ds were sold in the UK, but a number were exported to the United States and elsewhere.

Disadvantages

The main disadvantage with the Triple-D was the lack of suitable implements for such a powerful tractor, this meant that Ernest Doe & Sons also had to develop and build a range of implements to sell with the tractors.

Other disadvantages stemmed from the use of two engines, this made controlling the tractor more difficult because of the need for two gearboxes. There were two engines and gearboxes to maintain and repair and the probability of breakdowns was increased.

End of production

Legacy

The Triple-D often makes appearances at agricultural fairs such as the Epworth Festival of the Plough in Epworth, Lincolnshire and LeSueur, Minnesota Pioneer Power Days show where it is always a crowd favourite, popular due to its unorthodox build.

Triple-Ds are worth a great deal due to their relative rarity, even unrestored Does can demand extremely high prices at auction.

The Triple-D is also available in a 1:16 Scale model produced by Universal Hobbies

References

External links

Ernest Doe homepage
Tractorshed profile
YouTube footage of Does ploughing at Epworth

Tractors